Mudiyah is a village in south-western Yemen. It is located in the Abyan Governorate. It was the historical capital of Dathina state.

In March 2017, Amqoz, in Mudiyah district, Abyan province, was the site of a United States UAV strike on a vehicle, which is believed to have killed four members of Al-Qaeda in the Arabian Peninsula.

References

External links
Towns and villages in the Abyan Governorate

Populated places in Abyan Governorate